String Quartet No. 3 may refer to:

 String Quartet No. 3 (Babbitt) by Milton Babbitt
 String Quartet No. 3 (Bacewicz) by Grażyna Bacewicz
 String Quartet No. 3 (Bartók) by Béla Bartók
 String Quartet No. 3 (Beethoven) by Ludwig van Beethoven
 String Quartet No. 3 (Bois) by Rob du Bois
 String Quartet No. 3 (Brahms) by Johannes Brahms
 String Quartet No. 3 (Bridge) by Frank Bridge
 String Quartet No. 3 (Britten) by Benjamin Britten
 String Quartet No. 3 (Carter) by Elliott Carter
 String Quartet No. 3 (Chávez), from the ballet La hija de Cólquide by Carlos Chávez
 String Quartet No. 3 (Diamond) by David Diamond
 String Quartet No. 3 (Dvořák) by Antonín Dvořák
 String Quartet No. 3 (Ferneyhough) by Brian Ferneyhough
 String Quartet No. 3 (Halffter) by Cristóbal Halffter
 String Quartet No. 3 (Hill), The Carnival by Alfred Hill
 String Quartet No. 3 (Husa) by Karel Husa
 String Quartet No. 3 (Kirchner) by Leon Kirchner
 String Quartet No. 3 (McCabe) by John McCabe
 String Quartet No. 3 (Maconchy) by Elizabeth Maconchy
 String Quartet No. 3 (Marco), Anatomía fractal de los ángeles by Tomás Marco
 String Quartet No. 3 (Mendelssohn) by Felix Mendelssohn
 String Quartet No. 3 (Milhaud), Op. 232, by Darius Milhaud
 String Quartet No. 3 (Mozart) by Wolfgang Amadeus Mozart
 String Quartet No. 3 (Nielsen) by Carl Nielsen
 String Quartet No. 3 (Oswald) by Henrique Oswald
 String Quartet No. 3 (Parry) by Hubert Parry
 String Quartet No. 3 (Persichetti), Op. 81, by Vincent Persichetti
 String Quartet No. 3 (Piston) by Walter Piston
 String Quartet No. 3 (Porter) by Quincy Porter
 String Quartet No. 3 (Revueltas) by Silvestre Revueltas
 String Quartet No. 3 (Rihm) by Wolfgang Rihm
 String Quartet No. 3 (Rochberg) by George Rochberg
 String Quartet No. 3 (Rouse) by Christopher Rouse
 String Quartet No. 3 (Schoenberg) by Arnold Schoenberg
 String Quartet No. 3 (Schubert) by Franz Schubert
 String Quartet No. 3 (Shostakovich) by Dmitri Shostakovich
 String Quartet No. 3 (Spohr) by Louis Spohr
 String Quartet No. 3 (Tchaikovsky) by Pyotr Ilyich Tchaikovsky
 String Quartet No. 3 (Tippett) by Michael Tippett
 String Quartet No. 3 (Villa-Lobos) by Heitor Villa-Lobos